Ece Ege (born 1963 in Bursa, Turkey) is a Turkish-French fashion designer and founder of the prêt-à-porter line DICE KAYEK.

Career 

For her first collection in 1991, Ege created 13 shirts in white poplin, conceived a bit for herself. The success led to the launching of her prêt-à-porter line DICE KAYEK in 1992. With DICE, her second line launched in 1994.

Awards 

In 2003, she was chosen Femme en Or which is an award given to the most successful women in France.

References

External links
France24: Ece Ege, between East and West

1963 births
Living people
French fashion designers
Turkish fashion designers
French women fashion designers
Turkish women fashion designers
French people of Turkish descent
Turkish expatriates in France